The Reynolds Analogy is popularly known to relate turbulent momentum and heat transfer. That is because in a turbulent flow (in a pipe or in a boundary layer) the transport of momentum and the transport of heat largely depends on the same turbulent eddies: the velocity and the temperature profiles have the same shape. 

The main assumption is that heat flux q/A in a turbulent system is analogous to momentum flux τ, which suggests that the ratio τ/(q/A) must be constant for all radial positions.

The complete Reynolds analogy* is:

Experimental data for gas streams agree approximately with above equation if the Schmidt and Prandtl numbers are near 1.0 and only skin friction is present in flow past a flat plate or inside a pipe. When liquids are present and/or  form drag is present, the analogy is conventionally known to be invalid.

In 2008, the qualitative form of validity of Reynolds' analogy was re-visited for laminar flow of incompressible fluid with variable dynamic viscosity (μ).  It was shown that the inverse dependence of Reynolds number (Re) and skin friction coefficient(cf) is the basis for validity of the Reynolds’ analogy, in laminar convective flows with constant & variable μ.  For μ = const. it reduces to the popular form of Stanton number (St) increasing with increasing Re, whereas for variable μ it reduces to St increasing with decreasing Re.  Consequently, the Chilton-Colburn analogy of St•Pr2/3 increasing with increasing cf is qualitatively valid whenever the
Reynolds’ analogy is valid.  Further, the validity of the Reynolds’ analogy is linked to the applicability of Prigogine's Theorem of Minimum Entropy Production.  Thus, Reynolds' analogy is valid for flows that are close to developed, for whom, changes in the gradients of field variables (velocity & temperature) along the flow are small.

See also
 Reynolds number
 Chilton and Colburn J-factor analogy

References

Transport phenomena
Analogy